Seribantumab (INN; development code MM-121) is a monoclonal antibody designed for the treatment of cancer.

This drug was developed by Sanofi/Merrimack Pharmaceuticals, Inc.

References 

Monoclonal antibodies
Experimental cancer drugs